Karl-Heinz Urban (born 7 June 1972) is a New Zealand actor. His career began with appearances in New Zealand films and TV series such as Xena: Warrior Princess. His first Hollywood role was in the 2002 horror film Ghost Ship. Since then, he has starred in many high-profile movies, including as Éomer in the second and third installments of The Lord of the Rings trilogy, Vaako in the second and third installments of Riddick film series, Leonard McCoy in the Star Trek reboot film series, Kirill in The Bourne Supremacy (2004), John "Reaper" Grimm in Doom (2005), Judge Dredd in Dredd (2012), Gavin Magary in Pete's Dragon (2016), and Skurge in Marvel Studios' Thor: Ragnarok (2017). In 2013, he starred in the sci-fi series Almost Human. Since 2019, he has starred as Billy Butcher in Amazon's superhero streaming television series The Boys.

Early life
Urban was born in Wellington, New Zealand. His father, a German immigrant, owned a leather goods store, and his mother once worked for Film Facilities in Wellington. Through his mother, the young Urban was exposed to classic New Zealand cinema and developed an interest in the film industry. Urban attended St Mark's Church School, where he showed an early love for public performance. His first acting role came at age eight, when he had a single line in one episode of the New Zealand television series Pioneer Woman. Though continuing to take part in school stage productions, he did not act professionally again until after high school.

He attended Wellington College in 1986–1990. He then enrolled at Victoria University of Wellington in the Bachelor of Arts program but left after one year to pursue a career in acting. Over the next few years, he appeared in several local TV commercials in addition to theater roles in the Wellington area. Eventually, he moved to Auckland where he was offered many guest roles in TV shows (one of which was playing a heroin addict in the police drama Shark in the Park).  Urban then moved briefly to Bondi Beach, Sydney, Australia in 1995 before returning to New Zealand the following year.

Career
Urban's first Hollywood role was in the 2002 horror film Ghost Ship. Since then, he has worked on many high-profile movies, including the second and third installments of The Lord of the Rings trilogy (The Two Towers and The Return of the King) as Éomer, The Bourne Supremacy (as Russian Federal Security Service agent Kirill), The Chronicles of Riddick, Star Trek and Doom. The Hollywood Reporter speculated that Urban was one of several actors being considered for the part of British secret service agent 007 in Casino Royale, directed by fellow New Zealander Martin Campbell.

Urban played John "Reaper" Grimm in Universal Pictures' Doom (based on the first-person shooter video game Doom), which was released on 21 October 2005. In 2007, he starred in the Viking adventure Pathfinder. A longtime fan of Westerns, he starred as Woodrow Call in Comanche Moon, a television miniseries that aired in early 2008 as a prequel to the Lonesome Dove miniseries based on Larry McMurtry's book series of the same name.

In the 2009 film Star Trek, he played Dr. Leonard "Bones" McCoy, a role originated by DeForest Kelley in the original Star Trek TV series. A fan of the Star Trek franchise since childhood, Urban actively pursued a role in the film. His performance was widely embraced by the Star Trek fan community for its faithfulness to the spirit of Kelley's McCoy. Urban reprised the role in the 2013 film Star Trek Into Darkness and the 2016 film Star Trek Beyond.

Urban next appeared as CIA agent William Cooper in Red, adapted from the graphic novel of the same name and co-starring Bruce Willis and Helen Mirren. He portrayed Black Hat, a villainous priest-turned-vampire, in the film adaption of the Korean manhwa Priest, released in 3-D in 2011.

In 2012, Urban starred as law-enforcing comic book character Judge Dredd in the film Dredd. In an interview with Shave magazine, Urban described it as a "high-octane, action-fueled film... about the day in the life of Dredd". The film was directed by Pete Travis, with a script by Alex Garland. Though it underperformed at the box office, Dredd was well received by critics.

In 2013, Urban starred as Detective John Kennex in Almost Human, a TV series created by J. H. Wyman. The series was set 35 years into the future when cops in the L.A.P.D. are paired up with lifelike androids. Urban played a detective who has a dislike for robots but ends up being teamed up with one with emotional feelings. Urban next appeared in the ensemble thriller The Loft, a remake of the Belgian film of the same name. It was filmed in New Orleans and Belgium by the director of the 2008 original, Erik Van Looy. In January 2015, Urban replaced Michael C. Hall as the main antagonist in the 2016 remake of Pete's Dragon. In 2017, he played Skurge in Thor: Ragnarok. Also in 2017, Urban played a psychotic cop in the action thriller Acts of Vengeance opposite Antonio Banderas and Robert Forster. Urban had a cameo as a stormtrooper in Star Wars: The Rise of Skywalker in 2019. He voiced the lead role in The Sea Beast in 2022.

Since 2019, Urban has starred as William "Billy" Butcher in the Amazon Prime series The Boys.

Personal life
In September 2004, Urban married his longtime partner, Natalie Wihongi, who was his makeup artist for the 2000 television film The Privateers. Together they have two sons; Hunter and Indiana. His second son was named for the eponymous hero of the Indiana Jones franchise, which he has stated is one of his favourite movie series. They lived in their NZ$5.25 million mansion in the affluent Herne Bay section of Auckland, New Zealand. The couple announced their separation in June 2014, selling their home for NZ$6.65 million in December 2014. 

From 2014 to 2018, he was in a relationship with actress Katee Sackhoff.

Philanthropy 
Urban serves as a celebrity ambassador for KidsCan, a charity that currently supports over 16,000 disadvantaged children in New Zealand by providing them with essentials such as food, clothing, and shoes.

In May 2022, UNICEF Aotearoa New Zealand welcomed Urban as an official Ambassador to support in raising awareness on children’s rights both in New Zealand and around the world.

On 1 June 2020, Urban, together with Sean Astin, Sean Bean, Orlando Bloom, Billy Boyd, Ian McKellen, Dominic Monaghan, Viggo Mortensen, Miranda Otto, John Rhys-Davies, Andy Serkis, Liv Tyler, and Elijah Wood, plus writer Philippa Boyens and director Peter Jackson, joined Josh Gad's YouTube series Reunited Apart which reunites the cast of popular movies through video-conferencing, and promotes donations to non-profit charities.

Filmography

Film

Television

Video games

References

External links

 
 
 
 

1972 births
People educated at Wellington College (New Zealand)
Living people
New Zealand male film actors
New Zealand male stage actors
New Zealand male television actors
New Zealand male video game actors
New Zealand male voice actors
New Zealand people of German descent
Outstanding Performance by a Cast in a Motion Picture Screen Actors Guild Award winners
Male actors from Wellington City
20th-century New Zealand male actors
21st-century New Zealand male actors
New Zealand male soap opera actors
Victoria University of Wellington alumni